Allie Hann-McCurdy (born May 23, 1987) is a Canadian former ice dancer. McCurdy began skating at age eight and was a singles skater until age 12 when she switched to ice dancing. In 2003, she teamed up with Michael Coreno, with whom she was the 2010 Four Continents silver medallist and the 2008 Canadian bronze medallist. The pair retired on June 21, 2010, to coach at the Gloucester Skating Club.

Competitive highlights

With Coreno

Earlier partnerships 
(with Bauer)

(with Mathieu)

Programs 
(with Coreno)

References

External links

 
 Official site

1987 births
Canadian female ice dancers
Four Continents Figure Skating Championships medalists
Living people
Sportspeople from Nanaimo
Figure skaters from Vancouver
20th-century Canadian women
21st-century Canadian women